Alexis Peyrelade (born 16 April 1997) is a French professional footballer who plays as defender.

Professional career
Peyrelade made his professional debut with Rodez AF in a 0–0 Ligue 2 tie with LB Châteauroux on 2 August 2019.

Personal life
Peyrelade's father, Laurent Peyrelade, is a former footballer and his manager at Rodez.

References

External links
 
 
 Rodez AF Profile

1997 births
Living people
Footballers from Le Mans
Association football defenders
French footballers
Rodez AF players
Ligue 2 players
Championnat National players
Championnat National 2 players
Championnat National 3 players